Clinton Township is one of the twenty-two townships of Knox County, Ohio, United States.  The 2010 census found 2,826 people in the township.

Geography
Located in the west central part of the county, it borders the following townships:
Morris Township - north
Monroe Township - northeast
Pleasant Township - east
Miller Township - south
Milford Township - southwest corner
Liberty Township - west
Wayne Township - northwest corner

Much of eastern Clinton Township is occupied by the city of Mount Vernon, the county seat of Knox County. The census-designated place of South Mount Vernon is in the center of the township, adjacent to Mount Vernon.

Name and history
Clinton Township was established in 1808.

It is one of seven Clinton Townships statewide.

Government
The township is governed by a three-member board of trustees, who are elected in November of odd-numbered years to a four-year term beginning on the following January 1. Two are elected in the year after the presidential election and one is elected in the year before it. There is also an elected township fiscal officer, who serves a four-year term beginning on April 1 of the year after the election, which is held in November of the year before the presidential election. Vacancies in the fiscal officership or on the board of trustees are filled by the remaining trustees.

References

External links
County website

Townships in Knox County, Ohio
Townships in Ohio